Igor Olegovich Leontyev (born 18 March 1994) is a Russian football player who plays as an attacking midfielder for FC Shinnik Yaroslavl.

Club career
He made his debut in the Russian Professional Football League for FC Spartak-2 Moscow on 22 July 2013 in a game against FC Tambov.

He made his debut for the main squad of FC Spartak Moscow on 23 September 2015 in a Russian Cup game against FC Volga Nizhny Novgorod.

He made his Russian Football Premier League debut for FC Spartak Moscow on 25 October 2015 in a game against FC Dynamo Moscow.

Career statistics

References

1995 births
Sportspeople from Rostov-on-Don
Living people
Russian footballers
Russia youth international footballers
Russia under-21 international footballers
Association football midfielders
FC Spartak Moscow players
FC Spartak-2 Moscow players
FC Tyumen players
FC Chayka Peschanokopskoye players
FC Shinnik Yaroslavl players
Russian Premier League players
Russian First League players
Russian Second League players